Fabian Lienhard (born 3 September 1993) is a Swiss cyclist, who currently rides for UCI WorldTeam .

Major results

2010
 9th Road race, UCI Junior Road World Championships
2013
 6th Tour du Jura
2014
 National Under-23 Road Championships
1st  Road race
3rd Time trial
 1st Züri-Metzgete
 2nd Dijon–Auxonne–Dijon
 6th Overall Flèche du Sud
2015
 4th Tour de Berne
 6th Road race, UCI Under-23 Road World Championships
2016
 4th Tour de Berne
 6th Overall Tour de Bretagne
 8th Dorpenomloop Rucphen
 9th Ster van Zwolle
2017
 3rd Rund um Köln
 3rd Tour de Vendée
 3rd Tour du Jura
 3rd Tour de Berne
 4th Road race, National Road Championships
2018
 1st Stage 1 Tour de Normandie
 3rd Winston-Salem Cycling Classic
 7th Rund um Köln
2019
 1st Poreč Trophy
 2nd Overall Tour de Bretagne
 4th Druivenkoers Overijse
 6th Overall Tour du Loir-et-Cher
1st Stage 2
 7th Grand Prix of Aargau Canton
 7th Coppa Sabatini
 9th Flèche Ardennaise
2020
 5th Road race, National Road Championships
2022
 5th Road race, National Road Championships
 10th Cholet-Pays de la Loire

References

External links

1993 births
Living people
Swiss male cyclists
People from Dielsdorf District
Sportspeople from the canton of Zürich